The NCC Class WT is a class of 2-6-4T steam locomotives built by the Northern Counties Committee's parent company, the London, Midland and Scottish Railway for service in Northern Ireland.

History

18 Class WT locomotives were built at Derby Works in England to the design of George Ivatt between 1946 and 1950, numbered 1–10 and 50–57. They were a tank engine version of the NCC Class W moguls.  A tank engine did not require turning at termini and the LMS had produced a series of successful 2-6-4Ts. Like the LMS Fairburn 2-6-4T built at the same time, they had a hopper bunker and absence of plating ahead of the cylinders. They were based on the LMS Fowler 2-6-4T by Sir Henry Fowler.

There was at least one example of use of an adapted tender to achieve an extended range between water refills.

In December 1962, locomotive No. 50 received a boiler from one of the ex-NCC 2-6-0 tender locomotives, the boiler and firebox being overhauled and repaired at Derby.

In early 1966 and towards the end of their careers, the Class WT locomotives were involved in working notable traffic.  This was on spoil trains that transported fill for motorway construction from the Blue Circle cement works at Magheramorne to Greencastle near Belfast. Three trains of twenty hopper wagons each were made up, with a Class WT locomotive at each end.  Each train when filled carried  of rock and in all, some 7,600 trains had carried  of material by the time the contract ended in May 1970.

The last of the Class WT locomotives were officially withdrawn in 1971, the last time one was in traffic being 22 October 1970. This made them the last steam locomotives in mainline operation in the British Isles; Córas Iompair Éireann steam in the Republic of Ireland having ended in 1962 and British Railways steam in Great Britain having finished in 1968.

Preservation
One of these locomotives, No. 4, has been preserved by the Railway Preservation Society of Ireland (RPSI) following its withdrawal. The RPSI operates it on special mainline trains. It is currently operational after an overhaul was completed in June 2015.

No. 4 was one of seven that were converted to have an extended coal bunker in the mid-1960s to extend the range before needing refilling with coal.

No. 58 Project
The RPSI was considering the possibility of building a new member of the class (No.58) to give them a second mainline tank locomotive considering the low availability of turntables on modern day lines. However, a NCC Class W Mogul is being built instead, due to the longer range between coaling and watering allowed by a tender engine.

Technical details
The locomotives were built with many LMS standard features such as a self-cleaning smokebox, rocking firegrate, self-emptying ashpan, side window cab and a simplified footplate together with others which followed NCC practice, such as a water top-feed on a parallel boiler (as opposed to the taper boilers being used by the LMS at the time), Dreadnought type vacuum brake gear, Detroit sight feed cylinder lubricator and a cast number plate.

Notes

References

Footnotes

Sources

External links

 https://www.steamtrainsireland.com/rpsi-collection/4/no4

WT
Steam locomotives of Northern Ireland
2-6-4T locomotives
Steam locomotives of Ireland
Railway locomotives introduced in 1946
Passenger locomotives
5 ft 3 in gauge locomotives